The stromboid notch is an anatomical feature which is found in the shell of one taxonomic family of medium-sized to large sea snails, the conches. 

Marine gastropods in the family Strombidae have a notch in the edge of the shell aperture not far from the siphonal canal. This indentation is called the stromboid notch. Its function is to enable the animal to extend one of its two stalked eyes out through the notch when the animal is active.

See also
 Strombus
 siphonal notch
 siphonal canal

References

Gastropod anatomy
Mollusc shells